Kosta Iliev is a former Bulgarian basketball player, who played for Khimik Vidin, CSKA and Bulgaria.

He is currently employed by FIBA as Sports Director at FIBA Europe, and is charged with the development of 3x3 basketball, a discipline which is highly tipped to become an Olympic sport by 2016.

References

Bulgarian men's basketball players
Living people
Year of birth missing (living people)
Place of birth missing (living people)